Lisa Baldelli-Hunt (born June 13, 1962) is an American politician and Mayor of Woonsocket, Rhode Island.

Background
Baldelli-Hunt lives in Woonsocket, Rhode Island with her husband and family. She went to Bryant College and was involved with the commercial real estate business. Baldelli-Hunt also worked for the United States Postal Service. Baldelli-Hunt is a member of the Democratic Party.

Family 
Baldelli-Hunt's nephew is the baseball coach and player Rocco Baldelli. Her uncle is former mayor of Woonsocket, Charles C. Baldelli who served from 1985-1989.

In 2015, Baldelli-Hunt agreed to pay a $750 civil penalty for violating the state ethics code by hiring her son and teammates on his baseball team for unadvertised summer jobs.

Career

Elections and removal 
Baldelli-Hunt was elected to the Rhode Island House of Representatives for District 49 in Woonsocket, Rhode Island, in 2006. She served from 2007–2013. In 2013, Baldelli-Hunt was elected as mayor of Woonsocket, beating incumbent mayor Leo T. Fontaine. She was the second female mayor in the city's history. Baldelli-Hunt served until October 6, 2022, when she was removed from office by the Woonsocket City Council. Council President Daniel Grendon was immediately sworn in as interim mayor. Baldelli-Hunt ran unopposed in the Woonsocket mayoral elections and again won mayorship on November 9, 2022 for a fifth term with 76% of the vote. After winning the election, Baldelli-Hunt stated “It was undemocratic, it was horrific, to think and be so brazen that you feel that you have so much power and authority and you dismiss the vote of the people,” Baldelli-Hunt also stated that she had plans to revise the charter of the city of Woonsocket to prevent the City Council from removing mayors from office.

Sexual Offender Registration And Community Notification Act 
In 2011, Lisa Baldelli-Hunt proposed a law that would allow local police to place signs on public sidewalks or streets in front of the homes of people in the sex offender registry. The bill, which was co-sponsored by all the reps from Woonsocket, did not make it out of the Judiciary Committee. Baldelli-Hunt told GoLocalProv regarding people in the sex offender registry, “I’m not interested in their rights or protecting them. I have no concern for them because they are the worst of the worst.” Baldelli-Hunt proposed the law hoping it would goad registered people into moving into communities in other states. “It’s not our responsibility to be concerned with how other states handle their sex offenders,” Baldelli-Hunt said.

Reaction to Special One-Time Assistance Program 
In November 2019, Baldelli-Hunt objected to New York City's Special One-Time Assistance Program, which helped five formerly homeless families relocate back to Rhode Island communities without advanced warning. Baldelli-Hunt cited limited resources as her reasoning for opposing the program, and called on local social service agencies to get involved in blocking the moves.

Implementation of curfew 
In June 2020, Baldelli-Hunt signed an executive order imposing a temporary 8 p.m. city curfew for Woonsocket, following national protests against the murder of George Floyd. Baldelli-Hunt cited a “potential threat against city property" as her reasoning.

ARPA spending 
On November 15, 2021, a City Council meeting was held where Woonsocket residents showed up to demand that $36M received in federal American Rescue Plan Act (ARPA) dollars be spent on more housing and health resources rather than Woonsocket City Council's budgetary priorities of an ice skating rink with artificial ice, a new dais for the city council to sit upon, and updated lamp posts. Mayor Lisa Baldelli-Hunt responded to residents defensively. An opinion poll was executed before the release of Baldelli-Hunt's budget to determine where residents of Woonsocket wanted to see the money spent. The poll reflected residents wanted the money to prioritize housing, infrastructure, including paved roads and clean water, mental health and domestic violence services, and community health and wellness. On November 21, 2021, a rally of at least 40 people gathered to protest Baldelli-Hunt’s and the council’s proposed budget. Former Woonsocket City Council member, Alex Kithes, stated, “We’re here today because the first $14 million in our city’s ARPA funds were budgeted by the Mayor last week and passed by the City Council for the first time on Monday and they included nothing that our neighbors [wanted], nothing for housing and health." Participants noted the presence of workers from the Woonsocket Highway Department using leaf blowers and idling trucks in the park until the rally ended.

Resolution opposing harm reduction centers 
In 2022, after Rhode Island became the first state to legalize supervised injection sites, Baldelli-Hunt passed a resolution opposing harm reduction centers. According to the Valley Breeze newspaper, the leaders wrote that they “do not support or condone the consumption or use of illicit drugs” and would not place a harm-reduction center in the city of Woonsocket. In 2021, Woonsocket firefighters responded to 163 calls for suspected overdoses and recorded 11 overdose deaths.

Demolition of homeless encampment 
On January 4, 2023, Baldelli-Hunt ordered the demolition of a Woonsocket homeless encampment where nine people were sheltering by the Blackstone River. After police gave a 30-minute notice to the encampment residents, the Department of Public Works bulldozed the tents, and disposed of all belongings from the encampment into a dumpster. One resident, who had lived in a tent at the encampment for years, lost drawings from his children because of the demolition. Michelle Taylor, vice president at CCA, said police claimed there would be a bus that would take campers to an emergency shelter in Providence following eviction, yet a bus never arrived. Woonsocket service providers stated that the city never coordinated with them around supporting clients displaced from the demolition.

State Senator Melissa Murray criticized Baldelli-Hunt's administration for clearing the camps in an opinion letter on behalf of herself and colleagues in the General Assembly, Representatives Jon Brien, Robert Phillips, and Steve Casey, writing, "Bulldozing camps and destroying a person’s only respite from the elements is cruel and does not solve the problem of homelessness." The politicians also accused Baldelli-Hunt of pawning off homeless people on other municipalities. According to homeless people and their providers, homeless people from Woonsocket  were told by employees of the city to leave Woonsocket and go to Providence or Cranston. Woonsocket has the second highest number of people experiencing homelessness in the state. Margaux Morisseau, Deputy Director of the Rhode Island Coalition to End Homelessness, stated the demolition was a clear violation of the Homeless Bill of Rights that was made state law in 2012, and that victims have the right to sue.

Issuance of cease and desist order to methadone clinic 
In mid-January 2023, Baldelli-Hunt's administration issued a cease and desist order to CODAC Behavioral Healthcare's mobile methadone clinic demanding they move from the parking lot of the Community Care Alliance in Woonsocket. The clinic provides treatment for opioid use disorder to 40 patients a day. In 2021, Woonsocket had the highest number of overdoses in the state of any municipality.

References

1962 births
Living people
Politicians from Woonsocket, Rhode Island
Bryant University alumni
Businesspeople from Rhode Island
Women state legislators in Rhode Island
Democratic Party members of the Rhode Island House of Representatives
Mayors of places in Rhode Island
United States Postal Service people
Women mayors of places in the United States